Paasio is a surname. Notable people with the surname include:

Heli Paasio (born 1972), Finnish politician, daughter of Pertti and granddaughter of Rafael
Pertti Paasio (1939–2020), Finnish politician
Rafael Paasio (1903–1980), Finnish politician and editor